On January 23, 1973, Baruch Cohen, Mossad Director of Operations against Palestinians in Europe was shot and killed by a young Palestinian contact in a cafe in Madrid. Cohen was an Arabic speaker on loan to the Mossad from the Shin Bet internal security service.

Mossad then conducted a side operation, as part of Operation Wrath of God, to locate and kill Cohen's assassins, and at least three Palestinians involved in planning and carrying out Cohen's killing were assassinated.

References 

Israeli terrorism victims
Palestinian terrorism
Terrorist incidents in Europe in 1973
Murder in Madrid
Assassinations in Spain
Israeli people murdered abroad
1973 murders in Spain
1970s in Madrid
Assassinated Israeli people
People of the Mossad
People of the Shin Bet